Unnatural Selection is the seventh album by American thrash metal band Flotsam and Jetsam, released on January 26, 1999. It was the band's first album with two new members, Craig Nielsen (drums) and Mark Simpson (guitarist).

Unnatural Selection marked as a return to Flotsam and Jetsam's thrashy roots after almost a decade of musical experimentation with their metal sound, although it did continue the trend of most of their 1990s material, with the lyrical content focusing on social and political-related themes, whereas the band's 1980s output had Satanic/occult themes.

Track listing

Credits
 Edward Carlson – guitars
 Eric A.K. – vocals
 Jason Ward – bass
 Craig Nielsen – drums
 Mark Simpson – guitars

References

1999 albums
Flotsam and Jetsam (band) albums